Apostolos Tsourelas (born 17 July 1963) is a retired Greek football defender.

References

1963 births
Living people
Greek footballers
PAOK FC players
Aris Thessaloniki F.C. players
Iraklis Thessaloniki F.C. players
Super League Greece players
Association football defenders
People from Chalkidiki
Footballers from Central Macedonia